Couturier is the French-language occupational surname, literally meaning "seamster"/"couturier" 

The surname may refer to:

Catherine Couturier
Clément Couturier
E. A. Couturier (1869–1950), American cornet player and inventor
Paul Couturier (1881–1953), French priest
Marie-Alain Couturier (1897–1954), French Dominican friar, designer of stained glass windows
Louis-Charles Couturier (1817–1890), French Benedictine abbot, President of the French Congregation of Benedictines
Robert Couturier (sculptor) (1905–2008), French sculptor 
Robert Couturier (architect) (born 1955), French architect and decorator
Sean Couturier (born 1992), ice hockey player
Sylvain Couturier (born 1968), National Hockey League player, father of Sean
Malik Couturier (born 1982), French football defender

Occupational surnames
French-language surnames